Phlegon may refer to:
Phlegon of Marathon, one of the Seventy Disciples
Phlegon of Tralles, second-century Greek historian
Phlegon (mythology), one of the four horses of the chariot of the sun-god Helios in Greek mythology